Asca brevisetosa is a species of mite in the family Ascidae.

References

Further reading

 

brevisetosa
Articles created by Qbugbot
Animals described in 1965